Shiva Rindani (born Mukesh Rindani) is an Indian actor who appeared in Hindi films - mostly - in either villainous roles or in comic roles.

He has appeared in more than 100 films. His latest film was Deshdrohi in 2008, and  Hum as Captain Attack and  Ghatak: Lethal.

Filmography

Films

Kandy Twist (2019) as Director
Raqt (2013) as Director

Television

External links

References 

Male actors from Mumbai
Living people
Male actors in Hindi cinema
1964 births